The 2012 Russian Women's Cup was the 20th edition of the Russian women's football national cup organized by the Russian Football Union, running from 18 April to 5 May 2011. It is contested by all eight teams from the 2012 Russian Championship.

Zvezda Perm have won the cup for the second time after 2007.

Quarter-finals

Semifinals

Final

References

External links
Results at womenfootball.ru
Results at soccerway.com

Russian women
women cup
2012